Cerner CCL (Cerner Command Language) is the Cerner Corporation fourth-generation programming language, which is expressed in the Cerner Discern Explorer solution. CCL is patterned after the Structured Query Language (SQL). All Cerner Millennium health information technology solutions use CCL/Discern Explorer to select from, insert into, update into and delete from a Cerner Millennium database and allows a programmer to fetch data from an Oracle database and display it as the user wants to see. With features like Record Structure and subroutines it allows a user to get data from a database and manipulate it by storing it in a temporary structure; execute a particular section of the code, if required using a subroutine.

Complete for CCL (Cerner Command Language) is provided by Cerner Corporation.

Discern Explorer provides several applications that can be used to create, execute, and analyze ad hoc queries, reports and programs. These applications provide flexibility in the skill set needed to build programs and design reports. Discern Explorer programs can be written using, VisualExplorer.exe (VE), DiscernVisualDeveloper.exe (DVDev), an operating system command-line editor, or any other text editor. ExplorerMenu.exe (EM) is used to execute Discern Explorer programs on demand. ExplorerAnalyzer.exe (EA) allows its users to analyze the system resources used by RDBMS queries.

                  

CCL Hello World examples:
Example 1
 call echo("Hello World!") go
Example 2
 drop program helloworld2 go
 create program helloworld2
    call echo("Hello World!")
 end go
Example 3
 drop program helloworld3 go
 create program helloworld3
  PAINT 
  call TEXT(1,1, "Hello World!")
 end go
Example 4 class example
  DROP PROGRAM JCMCLASS1A GO
  CREATE PROGRAM JCMCLASS1A
   CREATE CLASS c_pat
    ;The c_pat class is an example class type which encapsulates the demographic members as well as the 
    ;methods needed to operate on this class.
    ;The class consists of optional sections with member and methods denoted with a namespace
    init ;class constructor
      call echo("init c_pat class section")
      DECLARE _::pvar1 = vc WITH CONSTANT("pvar1 test")        ;class instance member (default if namespace omitted)
      DECLARE class::pvar2 = vc WITH NOCONSTANT("pvar2 test")  ;class member shared across instances
      DECLARE _::pvar3 = vc WITH CONSTANT("pvar3 test")
      DECLARE private::pvar4 = i4                              ;private class instance member
      DECLARE _::instance_name = vc
      RECORD _::rec1( 
        1 qual
          2 birth_dt_tm = dq8
          2 race = c2
          2 religion = c2               
          2 year = i4
          2 month = i4
          2 day = i4
      )
      DECLARE _::set_month(year=i4,month=i4,day=i4) = null
      call echo(build("class::pvar2=",class::pvar2))
      SUBROUTINE _::set_month(year,month,day)
        SET _::rec1->year = year
        SET _::rec1->month = month
        SET _::rec1->day = day
      END ;subroutine
    END ;class constructor
    FINAL ;class destructor
      call echo(build("final c_pat class instance section:",instance_name))
    END ;class destructor
   WITH copy=1 
  END GO
  DROP PROGRAM JCMCLASS1 GO
  CREATE PROGRAM JCMCLASS1
    execute jcmclass1a  ;load class definition
    declare c1::i_patient1 = null with class(c_pat)  ;declare first instance from class c_pat
    declare c1::i_patient2 = null with class(c_pat)  ;declare second instance from class c_pat
    call echo(">>>class variable")
    set c1::i_patient1.instance_name = "c1::i_patient1"
    set c1::i_patient2.instance_name = "c1::i_patient2"
    call echo(">>>class record member")
    set c1::i_patient1.rec1->birth_dt_tm = cnvtdatetime("01-JAN-2012 08:30.00")
    set c1::i_patient2.rec1->birth_dt_tm = cnvtdatetime("01-FEB-2013 10:30.00")
    call echo(">>>class function")
    call c1::i_patient1.set_month(2012,10,16)
    call c1::i_patient2.set_month(2012,06,10)
    call echo(build("instance_name=",c1::i_patient1.instance_name))
    call echo(build("instance_name=",c1::i_patient2.instance_name))
    call echorecord(c1::i_patient1.rec1)
    call echorecord(c1::i_patient2.rec1)
    if ($1=1) call trace(38) endif
    ;display class info using class(<class_instance>,<class_info_id>[,<mode>])
    declare class_info=vc
    declare cid = i4 
    set cid = 1
    while (cid > 0)
      set class_info = class(c1::i_patient1,cid,1)
      if (class_info=" ") set cid = 0 else call echo(class_info) set cid=cid+1 endif
    endwhile
    set cid = 1
    while (cid > 0)
      set class_info = class(c1::i_patient1,cid,3)
      if (class_info=" ") set cid = 0 else call echo(class_info) set cid=cid+1 endif
    endwhile
    set curalias r1 c1::i_patient1.rec1->qual
    set r1->race="AB"
    select into nl from dummyt
      detail
        call echo(build("report=",c1::i_patient1.instance_name))
        call echo(r1->race)
    with nocounter
    call echo(build(">>>>>>>>>>>c1::i_patient1=",c1::i_patient1))
    free set c1::i_patient1
    free set c1::i_patient2
    if ($1=2) call trace(38) endif
  END GO

References 

Fourth-generation programming languages